At least six vessels of the British Royal Navy have been named HMS Decoy.

 , the name vessel for her three-vessel class of cutter; the French captured her in 1814
 , Cheerful-class gunboat broken up in 1869 at Haslar
 , a gunboat launched in 1871 and sold in 1885.
 , a torpedo boat destroyer launched in 1894 and sunk in a collision in 1904.
 Decoy, a destroyer ordered in 1945, the order being canceled January 1946
She was originally to have been named Dragon.

Royal Navy ship names